Raghiveh may refer to:
 Raghiveh, Haftgel
 Raghiveh, Shush
 Raghiveh District, in Haftgel County